Rio Covo (Santa Eugénia) is a Portuguese freguesia ("civil parish"), located in the municipality of Barcelos. The population in 2011 was 1,483, in an area of 3.13 km².

References

Freguesias of Barcelos, Portugal